Lorin Griset Academy is a continuation high school in the Santa Ana Unified School District in Orange County, California. It opened in 2006.  The current principal is Michael A. Parra.

References

External links
 Lorin Griset Academy Webpage

High schools in Santa Ana, California
Continuation high schools in California
Public high schools in California
2006 establishments in California